Maike van Niekerk is a Canadian activist, author, entrepreneur and medical student. She was raised in Corner Brook, Newfoundland. She founded the cancer charity Katrin's Karepackage, following the death of her mother, Katrin Kohler. Maike completed a PhD in Psychiatry at the University of Oxford, where she was a Rhodes Scholar. She previously completed a Bachelor of Science in Nursing at Dalhousie University, as a Schulich Leader Scholar.

Katrin's Karepackage
Van Niekerk's mother, Katrin Kohler, was diagnosed with breast cancer when van Niekerk was aged eight. She survived the first bout, but died seven years later when the cancer returned. Following her mother's death, van Niekerk began volunteering for the Canadian Cancer Society. In 2015, she ran seven marathons on seven consecutive days for a fundraiser. By September 2018, the charity had raised over $170,000.

Education
Van Niekerk studied a Bachelor of Science in Nursing at Dalhousie University, having won a Schulich Leader Scholarship. At Dalhousie University, she received the Silver Governor General's Academic Medal in 2017 for obtaining the highest academic standing amongst all baccalaureate graduates. In the same year, van Niekerk was awarded a Rhodes Scholarship, which allowed her to start a three-year PhD in Psychiatry at the University of Oxford. In 2020, she was awarded the Knight-Hennessy Scholarship, which allowed her to begin medicine at Stanford University.

Awards
Van Niekerk has been awarded a Meritorious Service Decoration. She received a Canadian Red Cross award for Newfoundland and Labrador's Young Humanitarian of the Year. In 2015, van Niekerk was one of Plan Canada's Top 20 Under 20. In 2017, van Niekerk was one of 100 people on the Women's Executive Network list of Canada's Most Powerful Women. In 2018, van Niekerk was one of ten honourees in the L'Oréal Paris Canadian Women of Worth Grant Award Program.

Bibliography

References

Businesspeople from Newfoundland and Labrador
Canadian women in business
Charity fundraisers (people)
Dalhousie University alumni
Newfoundland Rhodes Scholars
Living people
Year of birth missing (living people)